Jeffrey Richard Nordling (born March 11, 1962) is an American actor. He is known for his roles as Jake Manning in Once and Again, Larry Moss in 24, Nick Bolen in Desperate Housewives, and Gordon Klein in Big Little Lies, as well as various films.

Early life and education
Nordling was born March 11, 1962, in Ridgewood, New Jersey, to Robert George Nordling and Lois Nordling (née Dickson). He grew up in Washington Township. After moving to Saddle River, New Jersey, Nordling attended Ramsey High School, graduating in 1980. After high school, Nordling attended Wheaton College in Wheaton, Illinois. He graduated with a bachelor's degree in art in 1984. He received a Master of Fine Arts degree in 1987 from the Meadows School of the Arts at Southern Methodist University (SMU) in Dallas, Texas. Nordling is a Swedish surname.

Career
One of his major roles was playing Ted Orion, an NHL pro turned hockey coach in D3: The Mighty Ducks. The 1997 TV movie Soul Mates, starring Nordling and Kim Raver, is shown by market researchers at Television Preview as a "new" pilot. He played Gaëtan Dugas in And the Band Played On, the HBO production of Randy Shilts' chronicle of the evolving AIDS epidemic, and Capote Duncan in Sex and the City. In 1999 he portrayed original Apple investor Mike Markkula in the TNT movie Pirates of Silicon Valley.

He played Sela Ward's ex-husband, Jake Manning, on the TV drama Once and Again from 1999 to 2002. He starred as Brent Barrow alongside Courteney Cox in the series Dirt on the FX cable network in 2007–08. He has also appeared as FBI agent Larry Moss in the seventh season of 24.

During the 2009–10 season of Desperate Housewives, Nordling played Nick Bolen, a regular and the on-screen husband of Drea de Matteo, but the roles of the Bolens were discontinued after the one season.

Nordling starred as 9/11 hero Tom Burnett in Flight 93. In 2011, he began a recurring role on the medical/crime drama Body of Proof, playing Todd Fleming, the ex-husband of Dana Delany's character, which he played until the show's cancellation.

Filmography

Film

Television

Video games

References

External links
 

1962 births
Living people
20th-century American male actors
21st-century American male actors
American male film actors
American male video game actors
American male television actors
American male voice actors
Male actors from New Jersey
People from Ridgewood, New Jersey
People from Saddle River, New Jersey
People from Washington Township, Bergen County, New Jersey
Southern Methodist University alumni
Ramsey High School (New Jersey) alumni
Wheaton College (Illinois) alumni